The Wants may refer to:
The Wants (album) by The Phantom Band
The Wants (band), post-punk band